D'Erp Castle, also known as De Borcht, (Dutch: Kasteel d'Erp or De Borcht) is a castle in Baarlo, Limburg, Netherlands.  Dating back to the 13th century, it withstood sieges by William the Silent and Frederick Henry, Prince of Orange.  The castle is currently privately owned and not open the public.

Castles in Limburg (Netherlands)
Rijksmonuments in Limburg
Peel en Maas